Ferdinand Schumacher (1822–1908), also known as The Oatmeal King, was an American entrepreneur and one of the founders of companies which merged to become the Quaker Oats Company.

Biography
Ferdinand Schumacher was born in Celle, Hanover, Germany March 30, 1822, son of a merchant. He completed high school locally, and apprenticed in the grocery business. He pursued this, and clerked in a manufacturing business until age 28, when he and his brother Otto emigrated to the United States. He farmed for two years and established a grocery trade in Akron, Ohio in 1852. Remembering that back in Germany he used to grind oats and sell them as breakfast food. He decided to do the same in Akron, Ohio and in 1854, Ferdinand Schumacher started selling his oatmeal, and from there it branched out to the rest of the United States.  In 1857, he rented water power on the Ohio Canal in northwest Akron to power a mill for production of oatmeal. In 1858 he added equipment for pearling barley. He continued adding to his plant, and introduced steam power in 1875.

Ferdinand Schumacher married his cousin, Hermine Schumacher, in 1851, they had seven children, three of whom survived to adulthood. He was active in the temperance movement, and was strongly for prohibition. He supported the erection of many churches.

Schumacher ran unsuccessfully for Ohio Secretary of State in 1872 and 1882, and Ohio Governor in 1883 as Progressive Party nominee.

References

External links

 
 Description of Ferdinand Schumacher at the Cleveland Memory Project.

Quaker Oats Company people
1822 births
1908 deaths
Businesspeople from Akron, Ohio
American temperance activists
German emigrants to the United States
Activists from Ohio
People from Celle
19th-century American businesspeople